Stephen Ray Fuller (born January 5, 1957) is a former American football quarterback who played in the National Football League (NFL) for 10 seasons. He played college football at Clemson, where he was twice named ACC Player of the Year, and was selected by the Kansas City Chiefs in the first round of the 1979 NFL Draft. Fuller played his first four seasons with the Chiefs and was a member of the Los Angeles Rams during his fifth season. He joined the Chicago Bears in 1984, where he spent four seasons as a backup and was a member of the team that won the franchise's first Super Bowl title in Super Bowl XX. In his final season, Fuller was a member of the San Diego Chargers.

Early life
Fuller was born in Enid, Oklahoma and graduated from Spartanburg High School in Spartanburg, South Carolina.

College career
Fuller played college football at Clemson University in Clemson, South Carolina from 1975-1978.  He was a member of the Sigma Alpha Epsilon fraternity, Fuller was a football and academic All-America at Clemson University.

1975 season

In 1975, Fuller was 22-of-46 for 354 yards with two touchdowns and three interceptions. In addition, he had 47 carries for 148 yards as Clemson finished with a 2-9 record.

1976 season

In 1976, Fuller was 58-of-116 for 835 yards with five touchdowns and six interceptions. In addition, he had 157 carries for 503 yards with six touchdowns as Clemson finished with a 3-6-2 record.

1977 season
In 1977, Fuller was 106-of-205 for 1,655 yards with eight touchdowns and eight interceptions. In addition, he had 178 carries for 437 yards with six touchdowns as Clemson finished with an 8-3-1 record.

1978 season
In 1978, Fuller was 101-of-187 for 1,515 yards with seven touchdowns and four interceptions. In addition, he had 153 carries for 649 yards and ten touchdowns as Clemson finished with an 11-1 record.

College statistics

* Includes bowl games.

Professional career
Fuller was selected by the Kansas City Chiefs in the first round with the 23rd overall pick in the 1979 NFL Draft. He played in the National Football League for seven years, most notably with the Chicago Bears as their backup quarterback from 1984–1986, including the Super Bowl XX championship season in 1985. Fuller was named by Sports Illustrated as one of the top fifteen backup quarterbacks of all-time, based on his 1985 season with the Chicago Bears.

After not throwing a single pass during the entire 1983 NFL season, Fuller came in for the Chicago Bears in Week 10 of the 1984 NFL season against the Los Angeles Raiders after an injury to starting quarterback Jim McMahon halfway through the game. McMahon missed the rest of the 1984 season and Fuller became the Bears starter, all the way to the 1984 NFC Championship game against the eventual Super Bowl champion San Francisco 49ers.

Fuller was awarded a gold record and a platinum video award for the 1985 "Super Bowl Shuffle", for which he was the sixth of the ten solo singers. In 2010, during Super Bowl XLIV, Fuller joined other members of the 1985 Chicago Bears in recreating the Super Bowl Shuffle in a Boost Mobile commercial.

Personal life
Fuller and his wife, Anna, have two children. The couple live in South Carolina where Fuller was a high school football coach at Hilton Head Prep School. Fuller currently works as offensive coordinator for the Hilton Head Island High School football team.

References

External links
 

1957 births
Living people
American football quarterbacks
Chicago Bears players
Clemson Tigers football players
Kansas City Chiefs players
Los Angeles Rams players
High school football coaches in South Carolina
Sportspeople from Enid, Oklahoma
Sportspeople from Spartanburg, South Carolina
Players of American football from South Carolina